This is a selected list of notable people with links to the Bailiwick of Guernsey, in the Channel Islands.

16th century
 Catherine Cauchés, Guillemine Gilbert and Perotine Massey (?–1556), burned at the stake for heresy; Perotine Massey gave birth while tied to the stake
 Sir Henry de Vic (1599–1671), a founding member of the Royal Society, Chancellor of the Order of the Garter

17th century
 Edmund Andros (1637–1714), colonial administrator, governor of the Dominion of New England in America

18th century

 Peter Perchard (1729–1806), privateer, goldsmith and merchant, served as Lord Mayor of London in 1806
 Paul Le Mesurier (1755–1805), merchant, Lord Mayor of London 1793-4
 James Saumarez (1757–1836), Vice Admiral of the Blue and first Baron de Saumarez
 Major-General Sir Thomas Saumarez (1760–1845), commandant at Halifax, commander-in-chief of New Brunswick during the War of 1812
 Daniel de Lisle Brock (1762–1842), chief civic magistrate of Guernsey and brother of Sir Isaac Brock
 Richard Saumarez (1764–1835),  British surgeon and medical author
 Major-General John Gaspard Le Marchant (1766–1812), founder of the first British military college
 Sir Isaac Brock (1769–1812), Major General and Lieutant-Governor of Upper Canada, hero of Upper Canada
 John MacCulloch (1773–1835), geologist in the Channel Islands, England and Scotland
 John Le Mesurier (1781–1843), Major General and governor of Alderney
 Peter Paul Dobree (1782–1825), English classical scholar and critic
 Frederick Corbin Lukis (1788–1871), antiquary and natural historian including botany, geology, conchology, and science
 George Métivier (1790–1881), the island's national poet
 Margaret Ann Neve (1792–1903), first validated female supercentenarian and oldest ever Guernsey-born person, 110 years 321 days
 Thomas de la Rue (1793–1866), printer and stationer
 John Jeremie (1795–1841), British judge, diplomat and abolitionist
 Ferdinand Brock Tupper (1795–1874), historian
 Peter Broun (1797–1846), first Colonial Secretary of Western Australia, and a member of Western Australia's first Legislative Council
 Samuel Elliott Hoskins (1799–1888), physician

19th century

 Sampson Avard (1800–1869), leader of a band of Mormon vigilantes called the Danites
 William Le Lacheur (1802–1863), sea captain and developed the coffee business in Costa Rica.
 James Jeremie (1802–1872), Dean of Lincoln
 Bonamy Price (1807–1888), political economist
 Warren De la Rue (1815–1889), astronomer and chemist
 Francis Colborne (1817–1895), Commander of British Troops in China, Hong Kong and the Straits Settlements
 Paul Jacob Naftel (1817–1891), artist
 Edmund Kennedy (1818–1848), explorer
 Jasper Hume Nicolls (1818–1877), Canadian Anglican priest and first Principal of Bishop's College
 Maria Rosetti (1819–1893) née Grant, political activist and journalist
 Effingham Grant (1820–1892), diplomat and businessman, brother of Maria Rosetti
 Robert Carey (1821–1883), Major-General in the British Army
 John Elias Collings (1821–1886), General in the British Army
 George Jackson Carey (1822–1872), Major-General in the British Army
 Peter le Page Renouf (1822–1897), Egyptologist
 Denys Corbet (1826–1909), Guernésiais poet
 Duncan Charles Home (1828–1857), Victoria Cross recipient
 Terence O'Brien (1830–1903), surveyor, engineer and colonial governor of Newfoundland
 Walter Wren (1833–1898), member of Parliament
 John Richard Magrath (1839–1930), British academic
 Frederick Moynihan (1843–1910), sculptor
 Mrs. Bartle Teeling (1851–1906), writer
 Mabel Collins (1851–1927), theosophist and author
 John Frederick McCrea (1854–1894), Victoria Cross recipient
 Theodore Fink (1855–1942), elected to the Victorian Legislative Assembly, Australia
 Uchter Knox, 5th Earl of Ranfurly (1856–1933), Uchter Knox, Governor of New Zealand
 Samuel Mauger (1857–1936), Australian social reformer and politician
 Victor Herbert (1859–1924), musician
 James Arnold (1859–1929), New Zealand Member of Parliament
 Fanny Davies (1861–1934), pianist
 Havilland de Sausmarez (1861–1941), judge of various British courts in Africa and Asia, the Ottoman Empire and China
 Sir Henry Beauvoir De Lisle (1864–1955), British Army general
 Ernest Roberts (1868–1913), Labor member of the Australian House of Representatives
 Lewis Stratford Tollemache Halliday (1870–1966), Victoria Cross recipient
 George Edward Nurse (1873–1945), Victoria Cross recipient
 Herbert John Fleure (1877–1969), zoologist and geographer
 Ernest Martin Jehan (1878–1929), commander of a Q-Ship that sank German submarine UB-4 in 1915
 Arthur Maurice Hocart (1883–1939), anthropologist
 Percy Hodge (1890–1967), Olympic gold medalist, 3,000 metre steeplechase
 Ambrose Sherwill (1890–1968), President of the Controlling Committee during the German occupation of the Channel Islands, until he was deported
 Major-General Sir Thomas MacDonald "Donald" Banks KCB DSO MC TD (1891–1975), Director-General of the Petroleum Warfare Department 1940–45
 Barry Jones (1893–1981), actor
 Herbert Jolly (1895–1983), professional golfer
 James Parkes (1896–1981), clergyman, historian, and social activist
 Marjorie Ozanne (1897–1973),  Guernsey author
 Michael Davidson (1897–1976), journalist
 Gerald Basil Edwards (1899–1976), author of The Book of Ebenezer Le Page
 Beatrice Collenette (1899–2001), dancer

20th century
 Ethel Wood (1901–2011), supercentenarian
 John Louis "Bonnie" Newton (1903–1962) DSC, Croix De Guerre (étoile en argent), born in Alderney, Special Operations Executive operative 1940–45.
 John Harold Henry Coombes (1906–1978), Principal of Cadet College Petaro, one of the earliest public schools built in Pakistan
 Marie Ozanne (1906–1943), protester against the German treatment of slave labourers during World War II
 Robert Morley (1908–1992), actor
 John Le Patourel (1909–1981), historian
 Philip Maitland Hubbard (1910–1980), crime fiction writer
 William "Billy" Spurdle (1911–2011), footballer, played for Manchester City F.C.
 Mary Eily de Putron (1914–1982), stained glass artist and archaeologist
 Wallace Le Patourel (1916–1979), Brigadier, Victoria Cross recipient
 John Marr (1918–2009), author
 George Clarence Bassett Smith (1919–2001), footballer; played for Southampton F.C.
 Hubert Nicolle (1919–1998), considered to be the first Commando of WW2, landed in occupied Guernsey in September 1940
 Peter Brock (1920–2006), historian
 Peter Le Cheminant (born 1920), Air Chief Marshal and Lieutenant-Governor of Guernsey
 Frank Griffiths Caldwell (1921–2014), Major General OBE MC and bar
 Roy Dotrice (1923–2017), actor, winner of Tony and BAFTA Awards
 Sylvester Houédard (1924–1992), known as dsh, poet, literary editor and Benedictine monk
 Len Duquemin (1924–2003), footballer, played for Tottenham Hotspur F.C.
 William "Billy" Whare (1925–1995), footballer, played for Nottingham Forest F.C.
 Frederick Charles Hurrell (1928–2008), Air Vice-Marshal and Director-General of RAF Medical Services from 1986 to 1988
 Charles Wood (born 1932), playwright and scriptwriter
 John Savident (born 1938), actor, appears in many TV series, including Coronation Street
 Peter Le Vasseur (born 1938), artist
 Nicholas Edward Day (born 1939), statistician and cancer epidemiologist
 Bruce Parker (born 1941), BBC television presenter, first presenter of Antiques Roadshow
 Dick Le Flem (born 1942), footballer, played for Nottingham Forest F.C. and England U23
 Noel Duquemin (born 1944), shooter, Commonwealth and Island Games
 Chris Foss (born 1946), British artist and science fiction illustrator
 George Torode (1946–2010), writer and radio host
 Malcolm Wicks (1947–2012), Member of Westminster Parliament
 Richard Doyle (born 1948), British author of thriller novels
 Michele Dotrice (born 1948), actress, daughter of Roy Dotrice
 Simon Kay (born 1952?), plastic surgeon
 Adrian Fulford (born 1953), judge; formerly a member of the International Criminal Court in The Hague
 Karen Dotrice (born 1955), actress
 Aden Gillett (born 1959), actor
 Andrew Lawrence-King (born 1959), baroque harpist, director of The Harp Consort
 Craig Allen (born 1959), football player in North American Soccer League and Major Indoor Soccer League
 Adrian Breton (1962–2007), 1990 Commonwealth Games gold medal, men's rapid fire pistol
 Martine Le Moignan (born 1962), squash player
 Lisa Opie (born 1963), squash player
 Ashley Highfield (born 1965), media magnate
 Sarah Montague (born 1966), BBC journalist and news presenter
 Carl Hester (born 1967), dressage rider, Team GB Olympian and 2012 Summer Olympics gold medal winner
 Jenny Kendall-Tobias (born 1967), radio presenter for BBC Radio Guernsey; known and loved locally as JKT
 Matthew Le Tissier (born 1968), retired Southampton FC and England footballer
 Martin Brady (born 1969), world record holder of the slowest heart ever recorded in a healthy human
 Lee Luscombe (born 1971), footballer; played for Brentford FC
 Alison Merrien (born 1971), indoor bowls player
 Andrew Singleton (born 1972), human geneticist
 Andy Priaulx (born 1973), four times touring car race champion
 Lee Savident (born 1976), cricketer; played for Hampshire County Cricket Club
 Chris Tardif (born 1979), footballer; played for Portsmouth F.C.
 Dawn Porter (born 1979), BBC television presenter (born in Scotland but grew up in Guernsey)
 Lee Merrien (born 1979), athlete and Team GB Olympian
 Dale Garland (born 1980), athlete
 Paul Le Tocq (born 1981), badminton player
 Tom Druce (born 1986), athlete
 Chris Simpson (born 1987), squash player
 Tobyn Horton (born 1989), the Channel Islands' first professional cyclist
 Tim Ravenscroft (born 1992), cricketer; played for Hampshire County Cricket Club
 Heather Watson (born 1992), tennis player, 2009 US Open Girls' singles champion, Team GB Olympian and Wimbledon champion
 Harry Lewis (born 1996), better known as W2S, YouTube personality and member of the Sidemen
 Alex Crossan (born 1996), better known as Mura Masa, electronic music producer and DJ
 Cameron Chalmers (born 1997), British track and field sprinter

21st century
 Maya Le Tissier (born 2002), footballer; plays for Brighton & Hove Albion WFC
 Alex Jay Scott (born 2003), footballer; plays for Bristol City F.C.

Moved to and lived in Bailiwick of Guernsey
 General Sir John Doyle (1756–1834), Lieutenant Governor of Guernsey, drained Braye du Valle joining the north of Guernsey to the rest of the Island
 John Wilson, architect from Cumberland, lived in Guernsey 1813–1830, and designed some of the island's most iconic buildings, including Elizabeth College, St James, Castle Carey and the market buildings.
 Victor Hugo (1802–1885), author of The Hunchback of Notre Dame; lived in self-imposed exile on the island for 15 years, during which he wrote Les Misérables; Toilers of the Sea was dedicated to the island
 John Tapner (1823–1854), last person executed by Guernsey
 Pierre-Auguste Renoir (1841–1919), artist; spent summer of 1883 in Guernsey
 Henry Watson Fowler (1858–1933), lexicographer, moved to Guernsey in 1903
Lilian Lyle (1867–1953), botanist and phycologist, studied the marine life of Guernsey during the 1920s
 Francis George Fowler (1871–1918), lexicographer, moved to Guernsey in 1903
 Compton Mackenzie (1883–1972), author, tenant of Herm
 Nicholas Monsarrat (1910–1979), author of The Cruel Sea and more than thirty other novels; lived in Guernsey from 1959 to 1963
 John Le Mesurier (1912–1983), actor in Dad's Army; lived in Guernsey for the majority of his life
 Cyril Fletcher (1913–2005), actor, comedian
 Robert Farnon (1917–2005), conductor and composer; lived in Guernsey for 40 years
 Derrick Bailey (1918–2009), founder of Aurigny Airlines
 Desmond Bagley (1923–1983), best-selling writer of thriller novels; lived in Guernsey 1976–1983
 Ronnie Ronalde (1923–2015), siffleur, lived in Guernsey from the 1960s to the 1980s
 Eliza Beresford (1926–2010), writer, creator of children's characters The Wombles; lived in Alderney
 G. N. Georgano (1932–2017), author of reference books about motorcars
 Brian Walden (1932–2019), broadcaster and Labour politician
 David and Frederick Barclay (both born 1934), businessmen in media, retail and property
 Oliver Reed (1938–1999), actor in Gladiator, Oliver! and other films; lived in Guernsey for many years
 Dawn Brooke (born 1938), world's oldest natural mother; gave birth in 1997 at the age of 59
 Mary Perkins (born 1944), co-founder and a senior executive of Specsavers
 Raymond Evison, (born 1944), nurseryman, lecturer, author and photographer
 Norman Wood (born 1947), Scottish Ryder Cup player
 Guy Hands (born 1959), financier and investor, former chairman of EMI
 Wayne Bulpitt (born 1961), UK Chief Commissioner for The Scout Association
 Liam Mooney (born 1972), Businessman ex professional rugby player
 Zef Eisenberg (1973–2020), Maximuscle founder and motorbike land speed records holder

See also
 Category:Guernsey people by parish
List of Governors of Guernsey
 Lieutenant Governor of Guernsey
 List of Bailiffs of Guernsey
 Lieutenant Governor of Jersey
 List of Bailiffs of Jersey
 List of people from Jersey
 List of politicians in Jersey

References

People
Guernsey